Hamur is a town in the northeastern Nugal region of Somalia.

Notes
Hamur, Somalia

Populated places in Nugal, Somalia